Family tree of the Fourth Dynasty of Egypt, ruling ancient Egypt in the 27th century BCE to the 25th century BCE.

Chart

 01
04
Family tree
27th century BC in Egypt
26th century BC in Egypt
25th century BC in Egypt